Janice Gadsden Pendarvis is an American singer, songwriter, and voiceover artist. She has worked with artists such as Sting, David Bowie, Steely Dan, Peter Tosh, Brandy, the O'Jays, Philip Glass, Jimmy Cliff, Laurie Anderson, the Naked Brothers Band, and the Rolling Stones.

Personal life 

Janice was born and raised in Queens, New York.  She started her career as a songwriter and was once married to Leon Pendarvis, who is a longtime SNL band-member and keyboardist as well as a music industry composer-arranger.

She sang on a Roberta Flack background session for the Feel Like Makin' Love album, which included fellow background singers Deniece Williams and Patti Austin. David Spinozza, a good friend of Pendarvis, convinced her to become serious about learning the craft of singing.

Her most well-known commercial success has been being featured in the documentary Bring on the Night, profiling the music of Sting at the beginning of his solo career.  She was featured in the music video "If You Love Somebody (Set Them Free)". She also sang lead on the song "Lightning" from the Philip Glass album Songs from Liquid Days.

Pendarvis has served on the National Boards of the Screen Actors Guild (SAG) and the American Federation of Television and Radio Artists (AFTRA). She has also served on the NY Chapter Board of Governors of The Recording Academy (NARAS).

Currently, Pendarvis is an associate professor of voice at Berklee College of Music in Boston. She appears in the documentary film 20 Feet from Stardom (2013), directed by Morgan Neville.

Work with Sting 

Janice provided background vocals for Sting on his first solo album, The Dream of the Blue Turtles, which was nominated for a Grammy for Album of the Year in 1986. Pendarvis took part in Sting's first solo tour, sharing choruses with Dolette McDonald on the live album and movie Bring on the night. They both returned for Sting's next studio album ...Nothing Like the Sun. Finally, she was featured on Sting's ...All This Time live album recorded at the British singer's "Villa Il Palagio" in Italy, on September 11th 2001.

Discography 
 1974 : Feel Like Makin' Love by Roberta Flack
 1977 : Jungle Girl/It Ain't Easy - Single by Tamara Dobson 
 1978 : Evolution (The Most Recent) by Taj Mahal
 1979 : City Connection by Terumasa Hino
 1981 : Holding Out My Love To You by Max Romeo
 1985 : The Dream of the Blue Turtles by Sting 
 1986 : Dirty Work by the Rolling Stones - Alongside with Dolette McDonald on backing vocals
 1986 : Bring On the Night by Sting 
 1986 : Magnetic Love by Steps Ahead
 1986 : Songs From Liquid Days by Philip Glass
 1986 : Home of the Brave (soundtrack) by Laurie Anderson 
 1987 : ...Nothing Like the Sun by Sting 
 1990 : Terumasa Hino by Terumasa Hino
 2001 : ...All This Time by Sting
 2008 : I Don't Want to Go to School by the Naked Brothers Band - Soundtrack of the movie of the same name.
 2013 : The Next Day by David Bowie

Filmography
 1978 : The Wiz by Sidney Lumet - Singer 
 1985 - 1986 : American Masters by Susan Lacy - TV Series - Herself
 1986 : Bring On the Night by Michael Apted - Herself
 1986 : Home of the Brave: A Film by Laurie Anderson - Herself
 1990 : Green Card by Peter Weir - Singer 
 1997 - 2014  : Behind the Music by Gay Rosenthal - TV Series - Herself
 2001 : Sting ...All This Time by Jim Gable - Herself
 2004 - 2017 : The Apprentice by Mark Burnett - TV Series - Herself 
 2013 : 20 Feet from Stardom by Morgan Neville - Herself

References

External links
 https://www.discogs.com/artist/774945-Janice-Gadsden
 https://www.imdb.com/name/nm0671648/?ref_=ttfc_fc_cl_t119

Living people
Singers from New York City
Year of birth missing (living people)
People from Queens, New York
Berklee College of Music faculty